The clay pigeon floor procedure is a rare maneuver employed to gain political leverage in the United States Senate. The name comes by analogy with the clay target which shatters when hit in skeet shooting. In the procedure, an amendment comprising multiple proposals is shattered by demand of a single Senator into individual components to be discussed separately. By pre-agreement, a vote to limit total debate on the amendment is taken. Requiring a supermajority of 60 votes to abbreviate debate, all components are due for vote at the end of the allotted time.

Instances 
Two distinct goals have been recognized in the history of the procedure. Because individual features of an amendment are exposed to public airing, the process may coerce greater accountability. By contrast, in its most recent engagement, the Democratic majority used the tactic to curtail debate on immigration reform, thereby containing opposition.

 June 2007, Harry Reid (D), Nevada
 April 2006, Tom Coburn (R), Oklahoma
 circa 1970, James Allen (D), Alabama

References 

Terminology of the United States Senate